Trading Futures is a BBC Books original novel written by Lance Parkin and based on the long-running British science fiction television series Doctor Who. It features the Eighth Doctor, Fitz and Anji. One of the enemies in the book are the Onihr, a large rhinoceros-like species, notable due to their similarity to the Judoon.

The cover and elements of the story are spoofs of the James Bond movies.

The novel features a Bond-like character named Jonah Cosgrove, described by the author thus: “Cosgrove is (and I mean ‘is’ here in the very precise, non-trademark violating, sense of the word) the Sean Connery Bond, but one who never retired and who's been a secret agent for fifty years. So he's about eighty, and all the time he's just been piling on more muscles and getting more wrinkled, and ever more set in his ways and bitter and anachronistic. He's Sean Connery in The Rock, as drawn by Frank Miller, and by now he's been promoted to M.”

See also
 Outline of James Bond

External links
 The Cloister Library - Trading Futures
 

2002 British novels
2002 science fiction novels
Eighth Doctor Adventures
British science fiction novels
Novels by Lance Parkin